Four ships of the Royal Navy have borne the name HMS Grecian:

HMS Grecian (1814) was the five-gun American letter of marque schooner Grecian captured in 1814, armed with 10 guns, and sold in 1822.
 was the 10-gun revenue cutter Dolphin, that the Navy purchased and renamed in 1821, and sold in 1827.
 was a 16-gun brig-sloop launched in 1838 and broken up in 1865.
 was a launched in the United States in 1943, transferred to the United Kingdom under Lend-lease, returned to the Americans in 1947, transferred by them to the Turkish Navy that same year, renamed Edincik, and stricken in 1974.

References

Royal Navy ship names